Sean Gillam (born May 7, 1976) is a retired Canadian professional ice hockey defenceman. He was selected by the Detroit Red Wings in the third round (75th overall) of the 1994 NHL Entry Draft.

On June 13, 2011, Gillam was announced as the new head coach for the Fayetteville FireAntz in the Southern Professional Hockey League (SPHL).

Gillam was released on February 17, 2012, and replaced by Todd Bidner. At the time, the FireAntz had the worst record in the SPHL, at 12–25–5, and only 5–14–2 at home. The team also had the league's highest number of goals allowed, with 183, for an average of 4.4 per game.

Awards
 WHL West Second All-Star Team – 1995 & 1996

References

External links

1976 births
Adirondack Red Wings players
Detroit Red Wings draft picks
Canadian ice hockey defencemen
Jackson Bandits players
Living people
Mississippi Sea Wolves players
Rio Grande Valley Killer Bees players
Spokane Chiefs players